Václav Lanča (born 14 August 1966 in Ostrava) is a Czech former handball player who competed in the 1992 Summer Olympics.

References

1966 births
Living people
Czech male handball players
Olympic handball players of Czechoslovakia
Czechoslovak male handball players
Handball players at the 1992 Summer Olympics
Sportspeople from Ostrava